Ludwig von Siegen, O.F.M. (died 13 February 1508) was a Roman Catholic prelate who served as Auxiliary Bishop of Hildesheim (1502–1508) and Auxiliary Bishop of Minden (1502–1508).

He was ordained a priest in the Order of Friars Minor. On 20 May 1502, he was appointed during the papacy of Pope Alexander VI as Auxiliary Bishop of Hildesheim, Auxiliary Bishop of Minden, and Titular Bishop of Missene. He served as Auxiliary Bishop of Hildesheim and Auxiliary Bishop of Minden until his death on 13 Feb 1508.

References 

16th-century German Roman Catholic bishops
Bishops appointed by Pope Alexander VI
1508 deaths
Franciscan bishops